Rollerskating is the fourth studio album by Norwegian singer-songwriter Bertine Zetlitz. The album was released on November 1, 2004, and produced by Fred Ball.

Track listing

Chart positions

References

2004 albums
Bertine Zetlitz albums